The 2014 season is New Radiant Sports Club's 35th year in existence as a football club. New Radiant also participate in the AFC Cup this season, qualifying directly for the group stage by finishing first in the 2013 Dhivehi League.

Background
New Radiant finished as champions of last year's in the Dhivehi League, FA Cup, President's Cup and Charity Shield with a quadruple and 100% winning record. So they will be participating in the 2014 AFC Cup directly from the group stage. Ángel Pérez García was announced as the new head coach on 25 November 2013 and later on 4 March 2014 the agreement was terminated on mutual consent. Assistant coach Ismail Anil acted as the caretaker coach following the departure of coach García until the arrival of coach Simon McMenemy. Simon was at the job from 13 March 2014 to 10 May 2014. Before the local season began, club appointed the assistant coach Ismail Anil as the head coach on 10 June 2014. On 6 August 2014, New Radiant assigned Mika Lönnström as the new head coach for the club and Ismail Anil continued as the assistant manager.

Ismail Wisham was appointed as the club manager and Ibrahim Ibthisham as the club's Director of Administration. Ibthishaam was the club manager during the 2013 season. Ismail Anil was named as the assistant coach of the club on 12 February 2014.

Three foreign players Kingsley Chukwudi Nkurumeh, Mansa Sylla and Yusif Nurudeen were released by the club as their contract duration were over. New Radiant accepted the transfer request for Moosa Yaamin from the rival side Maziya on 30 December 2013.

Mohamed Umair, Ali Fasir, Ahmed Abdulla, Ahmed Niyaz, Imran Mohamed renewed their contract after the end of 2013 season.

Mukhthar Naseer, Ibrahim Fazeel, Shafiu Ahmed, Hamza Mohamed, Shamweel Qasim and Mohamed Rasheed were the local signings by the club for the 2014 football season.

Evans Mensah, Jonathan Quartey, were the foreign signings for the 2014 season. But Evans Mensah was released by the club, along with Ismail Easa on 16 February 2014 and Jonathan Quartey was also released by the club after the 2014 AFC Cup group stage.

Blues also signed a Brazilian striker Joelton Jonathan Sampaio but later terminated the contract due to a serious injury in a life-threatening car accident and was required to undergo several surgeries. So the agreement was terminated on mutual understanding between his agent and the club.

Before the local football season started, New Radiant signed three foreign players, David Carmona, Jamal Dibi and Dane Milovanović but on 10 August 2014, Dibi was released by the club on mutual understandings.

Club

Coaching staff

 Manager:  Ismail Wisham
 Head coach: Mika Lönnström
 Assistant coach:  Ismail Anil
 Kit Manager:  Abdul Sattar Ahmed
 Official:  Hussain Abdulla
 Official:  Ahmed Rasheed
 Official:  Ibrahim Shareef

Other information
 Chairman:  Ali Waheed
 Vice Chairman:  Hassan Shujau
 Director of Football:  Anwar Ali
 Director of Administrations:  Ibrahim Ibthisham
 Board Director:  Aishath Leesha
 Board Director:  Adheel Ismail
 Board Director:  Ahmed Zareer
 Board Director:  Adam Ziyad
 Board Director:  Ali Shareef
 Board Director:  Ahmed Rameez
 Board Director:  Mohamed Shafeeq

Kit
Supplier: Sports Power / Sponsor: Milo

New Radianst kits for the 2014 season were unveiled during the New Radiant night on 11 January 2014. Kits were supplied by the local brand Sports Power.

On 15 January 2014, New Radiant signed with two co-sponsors; with Tropic Investments Private Limited to market their brand Maldives Shipyard and the other with Timber House.

Pre-season
New Radiant preceded their 2014 campaign with the 2014 Milo Tour to Hinnavaru and played against Naifaru, Kuredu Resort and Hinnavaru.

Competitions

Overall

Competition record

*Draws include knockout matches decided on penalty kicks.

AFC Cup

Group stage

FA Charity Shield

Dhivehi League

League table

Rules for classification: 1) points; 2) goal difference; 3) number of goals scored.

Matches

FA Cup

President's Cup

References

New Radiant S.C. seasons